Kniphofia northiae, the giant red-hot poker, is a species of flowering plant in the family Asphodelaceae, native to the Eastern Cape of South Africa. In spring and summer the stout central stem bears oval flowerheads consisting of many tubular florets packed closely together. Green in bud, the flowers open to a muted red and fade from the base to yellow and brown, thus giving the appearance of a red-hot poker.

K. northiae is found above  in the mountain grassland of the Drakensberg from the Eastern Cape to KwaZulu-Natal. This species is named after the English botanical artist Marianne North.

K. northiae is valued in horticulture for its architectural qualities. Slightly larger and more tender than its cousin K. rooperi it favours milder locations such as the south west coast of England. It requires a situation in full sun, which is reliably moist but well-drained. It has gained the Royal Horticultural Society’s Award of Garden Merit.

Gallery

References

Flora of the Cape Provinces
northiae
Taxa named by John Gilbert Baker